Dame Gail Ronson, DBE (born 3 July 1946) is a British charity fundraiser and the wife of businessman Gerald Ronson whom she married when she was 21 years old; she has four children - Lisa, Amanda, Nicole, and Hayley - and nine grandchildren. She is also an aunt by marriage to Mark, Samantha and Charlotte Ronson.

A former model, Gail Ronson has contributed and supported a number of charitable organisations, including:

Roundhouse Trust, fundraiser
 Royal National Institute of Blind People (RNIB), President 2012
 Jewish Care (formerly the Jewish Welfare Board), former board member

Damehood and charitable activity
In the early years of her marriage, she became involved in charity work, handing out meals on wheels to elderly Jewish people. She later took part in charitable fund-raising initiatives: her first big project was the 125th anniversary of Jewish Care, in 1983, which was attended by Prince Charles and Princess Diana.

Gail Ronson was honoured for philanthropy and as a donor, especially to Jewish Care and the Royal Opera House. She was appointed Dame Commander of the Order of the British Empire, in the 2004 New Year's Honours List.

References

External links
B'nai B'rith Europe website

1946 births
Living people
Models from London
British Ashkenazi Jews
English Jews
Philanthropists from London
Women philanthropists
Dames Commander of the Order of the British Empire
Place of birth missing (living people)
Charity fundraisers (people)
Gail Ronson